This is a list of Amherst Mammoths football players in the NFL Draft.

Key

Selections

References

Lists of National Football League draftees by college football team

Amherst Mammoths NFL Draft